Bord na Móna (English: "The Peat Board"), is a semi-state company in Ireland, created in 1946 by the Turf Development Act 1946. The company began developing the peatlands of Ireland with the aim to provide economic benefit for Irish Midland communities and achieve security of energy supply for the recently formed Irish Republic. The development of peatlands involved the mechanised harvesting of peat, which took place primarily in the Midlands of Ireland.

Over the years, Bord na Móna has expanded and diversified its portfolio of businesses to include biomass procurement and supply, power generation (peat based and renewable), waste recovery, domestic fuel products and professional and consumer horticulture products. In 2015, the company announced that the harvesting of peat for power generation is to be "phased out" by 2030, at which point the company would complete its transition to new sustainable businesses located across its bogs and landholding.

The new sustainable businesses and activities located across Bord na Móna's bogs are said to include; renewable energy development, domestic fuels, biomass development, waste recovery, horticulture, eco-tourism, and community amenities. Although Bord na Móna will cease harvesting vast amounts of peat to supply power plants, they will continue to harvest peat for their horticulture and fuels businesses.

Despite these changes Bord na Móna and the extraction of turf remains controversial in Ireland as it is criticised as being the most environmentally unfriendly form of fuel and having a negative impact on local biodiversity while in receipt of state subsidies.

History 
Bord na Móna was originally established in 1933 as the Turf Development Board, Limited. The reason for the formation of the Turf Development Board was "to develop and improve the Turf Industry..." and "...to operate and drain bogs...". Later, in 1946 the Turf Development Board changed its name to Bord na Móna under the Turf Development Act 1946. This move saw a change in status from that of a limited liability company to a statutory company as well as some significant changes in strategy and operations.

World War II had a substantial impact on the development of Ireland's peat industry and the foundation of Bord na Móna in 1946. During the war, it was necessary to stockpile peat as a fuel given that coal was in short supply. This was due to a sharp reduction in imports and because the coal being imported was of poor quality. World War II resulted in the implementation of a number of emergency fuel schemes with a particular focus on peat as fuel for the people of Ireland, both inside and outside of traditional turf areas. It is estimated that before the war the annual production of turf per year was three million tons. The war effort added two million tons a year to this. The use of peat as a fuel source during World War II reinforced the government's commitment to develop Ireland's bogs as an indigenous source of energy.

After the war, the Irish government had a renewed focus on "the production of turf by mechanical processes and its sale at prices that cause it to compete effectively with other fuels". The war raised a valid concern around the security of indigenous fuel for Ireland. The resulting solution was a white paper issued by the government setting out what later became known as the First Development Programme.

Up to the 1950s, Ireland's bogs were harvested for turf, but from the 1950s right through to modern times the bogs were harvested for milled peat. This new method of peat harvesting gave way to harvesting on a scale not yet seen before in Ireland. A number of bogs in the Midlands were the proving ground for this new style of harvesting and are still in production to this day. The primary counties for peat harvesting were Kildare, Offaly, Galway, Longford, Roscommon, and Tipperary. These areas still continue to be the main areas of peat production.

In 2018, West Offaly and Lough Ree power stations received €87.75 million from the taxpayer to operate under the public service obligation (PSO) scheme. 5.3% of Irish homes used peat for heating. In 2020, the Bord na Móna announced that it was phasing out peat harvesting in Ireland. No jobs would be lost, and existing peat workers would be reassigned to bog reclamation projects rather than laid off.

On January 15, 2021, it was announced that peat briquettes would no longer be available after 2024.

Biodiversity 
Bord na Móna has been responsible for both gains and losses of biodiversity across the bogs under their control. This loss of biodiversity is due to the company's operations which progressively altered the terrain of bogs in their ownership. Bord na Móna has made considerable effort to offset the impact of their operations over the years. In the 1970s, a group of Bord na Móna employees, led by Tom Barry who was Peatland Environmental Officer at the time, drove an initiative to preserve a number of bogs, including Pollardstown Fen located in County Kildare and Raheenmore Bog in County Offaly. During the 1980s and 1990s, another internal drive saw the conservation of more bogs, including Bellacorick Flush County Mayo, Mongan Bog, Clara Bog, and All Saints Bog in County Offaly. These bogs are now owned and managed by An Taisce, the National Parks and Wildlife Service, and other organisations.

In 2010, Bord na Móna launched its first Biodiversity Action Plan. This plan set out a number of objectives and actions to be carried out over a five-year period 2010 - 2015. It gave an overview of rehabilitation work, natural colonisation projects, and the biodiversity of the company's cutaway bogs. It also highlighted the biodiversity projects in progress and those completed. In 2016, Bord na Móna released a second biodiversity action plan. This subsequent plan was developed to build upon the objectives of the first action plan while also looking to the future of Bord na Móna's peatlands with regard to Bord na Móna's announcement to stop harvesting peat for electricity production by 2030. Speaking about the biodiversity action plans, Bord na Móna's Senior Ecologist, Dr. Catherine Farrell said "We all need to work together in Bord na Móna to ensure the best outcomes for rehabilitation and biodiversity. This will be critical to the delivery of our Biodiversity Action Plans".

Harvesting 

Peat was traditionally manually harvested by operating cutaway bogs. This method (still privately used today) consists of sods being vertically cut from the side face of a peat deposit. Technology was derived to mechanically cut and remove layers of peat from blanket bogs. Today, equipment is used to remove tonnes of peat each day at suitable times of year (rainfall is a significant variable in peat harvesting). Almost all the peat now harvested is milled peat, scraped from the surface of the bog by tractor-towed pin millers. The milled peat is ridged into small piles which are then transferred by harvesters into large piles running parallel along the bog. Railways are laid alongside each pile, the pile loaded into trains and the railway lifted and moved to the next pile. This is the 'Peco' method of working. A few bogs use the 'Haku' method whereby the milled peat is loaded into tractor-towed caterpillar-tracked trailers and deposited in a single heap at the edge of the bog adjacent to a railway line. Each year, the network of drainage ditches is deepened by a few inches before the next harvest.

Bord na Móna has developed a number of products which were novel developments in their time. Today peat briquettes replace sods of raw peat as a domestic fuel. These briquettes consist of shredded peat, compressed to form a slow-burning, easily stored and transported fuel. The first milled peat plant run by the Bord was financed with a loan of £500,000 from Guinness in 1957. Another product developed was peat moss, a combination of peat and soil for use in the garden – particularly in pot plants. The company also supplies peat to power stations of the Electricity Supply Board and its own power station Edenderry Power.

Railways 
An extensive  narrow gauge network is operated by the company in the midlands.  Some smaller sections of railway were used in other bog locations, for example in County Donegal until recent years. Bord na Móna has an extensive network, which has carried up to 5 million tonnes annually, and is larger than the main network (passenger and freight) operated by Iarnród Éireann. Bord na Móna has one of the largest industrial railways in Europe.
Permanent railways run from a hundred peat bogs, each covering hundreds of acres, to power stations, briquette factories, moss peat factories and roadside tipplers. On most of the bogs, temporary tracks are laid along the piles of peat the full length of most bogs. Before a pile has been cleared, another temporary line will have been laid a few hundred feet farther along. More than 300 kilometers (approx 180 miles) of temporary track are laid each year and the Bord have specialist track fabrication workshops, tracklaying machines, and a fleet of dedicated locomotives and rolling stock on hand.
A few bogs are operated by the Haku process, where the peat is collected in one huge heap at the end or side of a bog, requiring only one railway line to serve it.

Part of the Blackwater bog system was also used for tourist trains - the Clonmacnoise and West Offaly Railway (colloquially the "Bog Train") for about twelve years. This service ceased permanently in October 2008 as it interfered with the heavy peat traffic heading for West Offaly Power Station. One line of the Blackwater system runs along a section of the former Ballinasloe branch canal. This includes a section where the railway runs through Kylemore Lock. The newest branch of this system runs north from existing bogs at Bloomhill to the new bogs of Kilgarvan and Bunnahinley – the latter in the outskirts of Athlone – and opened for traffic c. 2011.

All three of Bord na Móna's old steam locomotives are preserved, one by the Irish Steam Preservation Society at Stradbally, County Laois.

Each of the three power stations – West Offaly at Shannonbridge, Co Offaly; Edenderry, Co Offaly; Lough Ree, Lanesborough, Co Longford – is the hub of an extensive rail network carrying heavy traffic. As an example, twelvetrains or rakes (locomotive and sixteen wagons) were in daily use sixteen hours a day at West Offaly in April 2009. Other, generally older locomotives, handle fuel trains, track trainloads of track, ash trains and permanent way gangs.  the Edenderry Power Station is deriving a lot of its fuel from woodchips and other types of biomass. Thus the amount of peat arriving by rail is diminishing.

The two briquette factories at Derrinlough, Co Offaly and Littleton, Co Tipperary each have rail connections to 6 or 8 working bogs. Between four and six peat trains work on each system, the trains almost always travelling in pairs as they do at the power stations.

Bord na Móna also operates several smaller bog railways delivering the peat to tipplers for transfer by road to factories and power stations.

They can be found at Gilltown, Ummeras, Kilberry, Prosperous and Almhain North - all in Co Kildare, Coolnamona in Co Laois, Derryfadda in Galway, Coolnagun, Ballivor and Kinnegad in Westmeath, Monettia, Bellair and Killaun in Offaly, and Templetuohy on the Tipperary / Kilkenny border. The Coolnamona Works is largely closed but the railway system was upgraded in 2010/11 to serve a new tippler supplying peat by road to Littleton (Lanespark) Briquette Factory.

Locomotives and rolling stock, for many years bought in from outside companies, are now designed and built in-house. New locomotives are invariably 0-4-0DH (diesel-hydraulic) or 4wDH (no connecting rods). Most peat wagons are of the bogie type with aluminium bodies to reduce weight, though there were still thirty or so old steel-bodied wagons in use as of 2009. Templetuohy, the Bord's last traditional sod peat operation, uses four-wheeled open-slatted wagons which end tip into waiting lorries.

Land reclamation 

The company is responsible, under government action, for reclaiming spent bogland. These areas of land are usually cleared up, with trees or other suitable vegetation being introduced. Reclaimed bogland is then usually used as a wildlife preserve. With much of the bogs of Ireland depleted, peat-fired electricity stations all closed by 2020. Rhode Power Station near Edenderry, County Offaly, had its cooling towers demolished on 16 March 2004 as it was no longer viable, followed by Bellacorick in north County Mayo on 14 October 2007. The West Offaly Power Station in Shannonbridge will be demolished in 2020 or 2021.

See also 
 List of Irish companies
 List of narrow gauge railways in Ireland
 Bog
 Peat energy in Finland - another EU member still burning significant amount of peat for energy generation

References

External links 
 Official site - Bord na Móna
 Kylemore Lock and BNM train
 Heartland, celebrating the 75th anniversary of the Turf Development Board

Energy companies of the Republic of Ireland
Geology of Ireland
3 ft gauge railways in Ireland
Industrial railways
State-sponsored bodies of the Republic of Ireland
Bogs of the Republic of Ireland
Peat mining
Department of the Environment, Climate and Communications